Gurnam Singh  (August 16, 1931 in Punjab, India – December 7, 2006 in Jakarta, Indonesia) was a former Indonesian track and field athlete who won a bronze medal in the 10000 meters run event during  the fourth Asian Games in 1962 in Jakarta. Rusli Lutan described him as "remembered as a unique runner who ran bare-footed."

References 

1931 births
Indonesian male long-distance runners
Indonesian Sikhs
Sportspeople from Medan
Indian emigrants to Indonesia
Indonesian people of Indian descent
Asian Games medalists in athletics (track and field)
Athletes (track and field) at the 1962 Asian Games
Indonesian people of Punjabi descent
Asian Games bronze medalists for Indonesia
Medalists at the 1962 Asian Games
20th-century Indonesian people
21st-century Indonesian people
2006 deaths